The 1978 African Cup of Champions Clubs was the 14th edition of the annual international club football competition held in the CAF region (Africa), the African Cup of Champions Clubs. It determined that year's club champion of the association football in Africa.

The tournament was played by 24 teams and was used a playoff scheme with home and away matches. Canon Yaoundé from Cameroon won that final, and became for the second time CAF club champion.

First round

|}
1

Second round

|}
1

Quarter-finals

|}

Semi-finals

|}

Final

Champion

Top scorers

The top scorers from the 1978 African Cup of Champions Clubs are as follows:

References
RSSSF.com

1
African Cup of Champions Clubs